This is a list of songs which reached number one on the Billboard Mainstream Top 40 (or Pop Songs) chart in 2012.

During 2012, a total of 19 singles hit number-one on the charts.

Chart history

See also
2012 in music

References

External links
Current Billboard Pop Songs chart

Billboard charts
Mainstream Top 40 2012
United States Mainstream Top 40